Joseph Yieleh Chireh (born 8 July 1954) is a Ghanaian pharmacist, barrister, diplomat and politician. He is the a former Member for Parliament for Wa West. He served in the 4th, 5th, 6th and 7th parliament of the 4th Republic of Ghana. He is also a Member of the Pan-African Parliament.

Early life and education
Chireh was born in Lassia Tuolu in the Upper West Region of Ghana. He had his secondary school educated at the Navrongo Secondary School in the Upper East Region where he studied for both his GCE Ordinary and Advanced level certificate. He studied at the Kwame Nkrumah University of Science and Technology from 1975 and obtained the Bachelor of Pharmacy degree in 1979. He proceeded to the Ghana School of Law in 2001 and qualified as a barrister in 2006.

Politics and diplomatic service
He is a member of the National Democratic Congress. Yieleh Chireh served as the Chairman of the Procurement Taskforce set up by the PNDC Government in 1991. As chairman he is credited with spearheading the investigations of procurement malpractices in selected Ministries, Departments and Agencies (MDAs) notable amongst them is the Ministry of Health, the Volta River Authority, Electricity Corporation of Ghana and also the former Post & Telecommunications Corporation.

He has served in different roles from Regional minister, Ambassador, member of parliament to Minister of Local Government and Rural development and also Minister of health.

Regional Minister - Amabassador 
Chireh joined the National Democratic Congress when it was formed in 1992 on the resumption of party politics in Ghana. He was appointed by Jerry Rawlings as Upper West Regional Minister in his government in 1993.

He served in that role from 1993 to 1997. He was subsequently made the Ambassador Extraordinary and Plenipotentiary to Algeria with concurrent accreditation to Tunisia, the Sahrawi Arab Democratic Republic and Mauritania between 1997 and 2001. He subsequently served as member of parliament in the 4th, 5th,6th, and 7th parliament from January 2005- January 2021.

Member of parliament

2004 elections 
He contested the newly created Wa West constituency seat in the Ghanaian parliamentary election in December 2004, which he won leading to his taking his seat in the Fourth parliament of the Fourth Republic. Chireh was elected as the member of parliament for the Wa west constituency in the 2004 Ghanaian general elections. He thus represented the constituency in the 4th parliament of the 4th republic of Ghana. He was elected with 13,256 votes out of 19,980 total valid votes cast. This was equivalent to 66.3% of the total valid votes cast. He was elected over Vaari Matthew Saa-hi of the People's National Convention and Edward Yirimambo of the New Patriotic Party. These obtained 653votes and 6,071 votes respectively of the total valid votes cast. These were equivalent to 3.3% and 30.4% respectively of the total valid votes cast. Chireh was elected on the ticket of the National Democratic Congress. In that election, the National Democratic Congress won a minority total of 94 parliamentary representation out of a total 230seats in the 4th parliament of the 4th republic of Ghana.

2008,2012 elections 
He retained his seat in the 2008 after winning with 10,468 votes representing 50% against his closest opponents Dari Daniel Kuusongno of the New Patriotic Party, Edward B. Yirimanbo, an independent candidate who had 4,455 votes representing 21.3% and 5,541 votes representing 26.5% respectively. In the 5th parliament  he served on the Foreign Affairs committee, Employment, Social Welfare and State Enterprises committee.

Chireh retained his seat again in the 2012 parliamentary elections after securing 16,368 votes representing 57.71% against his closest contender the New Patriotic Party's candidate Adams Nuhu Timbile who had 9,918 representing 34.97%

2016 elections 
Chireh was voted for again to represent the Wa West constituency for a 4th term in the 7th parliament. He polled 12,658 votes, 42.49% whilst his two main opponents Patrick Bandanaa, an independent candidate and Dari Daniel Kuusongno of the New Patriotic Party who he had faced in the 2008 had 8,806 votes, 29.56% and 7,415%, 24.89% respectively.

In the 7th parliament of the 4th republic, he served on the Subsidiary Legislation Committee, Local Government and Rural Development Committee and Appointments Committee.

In his bid to go for another term and be part of the 8th parliament he was defeated in the National Democratic Congress Primaries by former IGP executive secretary Peter Lanchene Toobu who polled 755 votes as against the 317 votes obtained by Chireh.

Minister of state 
In February 2009, he was appointed Minister for Local Government and Rural Development by the new President of Ghana, John Atta Mills. He served as a member of John Atta Mills cabinet ministers. He served there until 4 January 2011, when he was appointed Minister of Health by the President, John Evans Atta Mills in a cabinet reshuffle.

Professional association 
He is registered Pharmacist at the Ghana Pharmacy Council, a fellow of the pharmacy society of Ghana and a fellow of the West Africa post graduate college of pharmacist. He is also a lawyer and member of the Ghana Bar Association.

Chairman of FBNBank Ghana 
Chireh served as the board chairman for FBNBank Ghana, a subsidiary of First Bank of Nigeria Limited for two terms, 6 years served two terms dating from 2014 to 2020.

Personal
Chireh is a Christian and is married with 4 children.

See also
Rawlings government
List of Mills government ministers
Wa West constituency

References

External links and sources
Profile on Parliament of Ghana website

Living people
1954 births
Kwame Nkrumah University of Science and Technology alumni
Health ministers of Ghana
Local government ministers of Ghana
Ghanaian MPs 2005–2009
Ghanaian MPs 2009–2013
Ghanaian MPs 2013–2017
Ghanaian bankers
Ghanaian pharmacists
National Democratic Congress (Ghana) politicians
Ambassadors of Ghana to Algeria
Ambassadors of Ghana to Tunisia
Ambassadors of Ghana to Mauritania
Ambassadors of Ghana to the Sahrawi Arab Democratic Republic
Ghana School of Law alumni
People from Upper West Region